Andreas Skentzos (born 23 September 1972) is a retired Greek football defender and later manager.

References

1972 births
Living people
Greek footballers
Panelefsiniakos F.C. players
OFI Crete F.C. players
Aris Thessaloniki F.C. players
Ergotelis F.C. players
Rodos F.C. players
Super League Greece players
Association football defenders
Greek expatriate sportspeople in Cyprus
Greek football managers
Aris Thessaloniki F.C. non-playing staff
Footballers from Elefsina